Donsin may refer to several settlements in Burkina Faso:

 
 Donsin, Bissiga, a village in Bissiga Department, Boulgou Province

 Donsin, Gounghin, a village in Gounghin Department, Kouritenga Province
 Donsin, Loumbila, a village in Loumbila Department, Oubritenga Province